This is a list of Swedish football transfers in the 2020 summer transfer window by club. Only clubs of the 2020 Allsvenskan are included.

Allsvenskan

AIK

In:

Out:

Djurgården

In:

Out:

Elfsborg

In:

Out:

Falkenberg

In:

Out:

Hammarby

In:

Out:

Helsingborg

In:

Out:

Häcken

In:

Out:

IFK Göteborg

In:

Out:

Kalmar

In:

Out:

Malmö

In:

Out:

Mjällby

In:

Out:

Norrköping

In:

Out:

Sirius

In:

Out:

Varberg

In:

Out:

Örebro

In:

Out:

Östersund

In:

Out:

References

Sweden
2020 in Swedish football
2020